Hajjiabad-e Do may refer to:
Hajjiabad-e Do, Kerman
Hajjiabad-e Do, Kermanshah